Independencia is a station on Line E of the Buenos Aires Underground. From here, passengers may transfer to the Independencia Station on Line C and Metrobus 9 de Julio. The station was opened on 24 April 1966 as part of the extension of the line from San José to Bolívar.

The station lies lies under the intersection of Avenida Independencia (from which it takes its name) and Avenida 9 de Julio. Notable sites within walking distance of the station include the Argentine University of Enterprise (UADE) and the University of Buenos Aires Faculty of Social Sciences.

The station was used as a set in the 1996 Argentine science fiction film Moebius.

References

External links

Buenos Aires Underground stations